Ján Tabaček (born 7 April 1980 in Martin) is a Slovak ice hockey player who is currently playing for HK Martin in the Slovak 1. Liga.

Career statistics

External links

1980 births
Living people
Slovak ice hockey defencemen
Cincinnati Mighty Ducks players
Dayton Bombers players
GCK Lions players
HC Slovan Bratislava players
HC Sparta Praha players
HC Košice players
Lempäälän Kisa players
MHC Martin players
MHk 32 Liptovský Mikuláš players
Anaheim Ducks draft picks
Sportspeople from Martin, Slovakia
Tappara players
ZSC Lions players
Slovak expatriate ice hockey players in the United States
Slovak expatriate ice hockey players in the Czech Republic
Slovak expatriate ice hockey players in Finland
Slovak expatriate ice hockey players in Switzerland